The Miller Round Barn was a historic building located near Sharon Center in rural Johnson County, Iowa, United States. It was constructed in 1918 by John Schrader. The bank barn that was built on a slope was an example of the Illinois Agricultural Experiment Station / H.E. Crouch type. The building was a true round barn that measured  in diameter. It was covered in white vertical siding and features a two-pitch roof and a  central silo. It was listed on the National Register of Historic Places since 1986. The barn has subsequently been torn down.

References

Infrastructure completed in 1918
Buildings and structures in Johnson County, Iowa
National Register of Historic Places in Johnson County, Iowa
Barns on the National Register of Historic Places in Iowa
Round barns in Iowa